Kaikhosro (also spelled Kay Khusrau, Kai Khusraw) (January 1, 1674 – September 27, 1711), of the House of Bagrationi, was a titular king (a Persian-appointed wali) of Kartli, eastern Georgia, from 1709 to 1711. He reigned in absentia since he served during the whole of this period as a Persian commander-in-chief in what is now Afghanistan.

Biography 
Kaikhosro was the son of Prince Levan, and accompanied his father during the service in the Safavid Empire. Since 1703, Kaikhosro himself served on high posts in the Persian administration, including being a darougha (prefect) of the capital city of Isfahan and a naib (deputy) to the divanbeg (chief justice). On the death of his uncle, Gurgin Khan (George XI), in 1709, he was confirmed as a wali/king of Kartli and a sipah-salar (commander-in-chief) of the Persian armies in what is now Afghanistan, and granted Tabriz and Barda in possession. He spent the whole of this period in field, and Kartli was administered by his brother Vakhtang.

In November 1709, Kaikhosro led a new Persian–Georgian army, supported by contingents from Khorasan, Herat, and Kerman, against the Afghans after Gurgin Khan was exterminated by Mir Wais Hotak, a rebel chieftain of the Ghilzai. Kaikhosro's efforts to take Kandahar, however, were in vain. A fragile truce ensued, but in the summer of 1711 the hostilities were resumed. Kaikhosro forced the rebels to withdraw within the walls of Kandahar city which was placed under siege. However, the position of the besiegers soon became precarious due to attacks by the Balochs. The fighting took life of the Georgian prince Alexander. On October 26, 1711, Kaikhosro ordered a retreat from the city. The Afghans attacked the retreating army and won a crushing victory; Kaikhosro was killed when he fell off his horse and his entire army of 30,000 soldiers (of whom only some 700 escaped) was annihilated.

Family 
Kaikhosro was married to Ketevan, the daughter of a man named Giorgi. Her surname is not known. In the 1720s, she followed the royal family of Kartli in their flight to the Russian Empire, where she was known as the tsaritsa Ekaterina Igoriyevna. She died in Moscow on 3 May 1730 and was buried at the Greek Church of St. Nicholas in Kitaigorod.

Kaikhosro had four children, three—David, Ana, and Khoreshan—by Ketevan, and one—Shahanavaz-Khan—by a concubine.

 Prince David (1710—1738) was married to a certain Mariam, lived in Russia and died at Moscow, being buried at the Donskoy Monastery.
 Princess Ana (died 1786).
 Princess Khoreshan (died 1732) married first to Shah Sultan Husayn of Iran in 1710 and second, after the shah's death in 1727, the khan of Erivan.
 Prince Shahnavaz (Shanaoz-Khan;  1742).

See also 
Kings of Kartli
Iranian Georgians

Notes and references 

Martin Sicker, The Islamic World in Decline: From the Treaty of Karlowitz to the Disintegration of the Ottoman Empire (Hardcover) (2000), Praeger/Greenwood, page 44

External links 
Nancy Hatch Dupree - Mir Wais Hotak (1709–1715)

House of Mukhrani
Safavid appointed kings of Kartli
1674 births
1711 deaths
Iranian people of Georgian descent
Safavid prefects of Isfahan
Qollar-aghasi
Commanders-in-chief of Safavid Iran
17th-century people of Safavid Iran
18th-century people of Safavid Iran